Neuadd Wilym is a small village in the  community of Llangoedmor, Ceredigion, Wales, which is 74.2 miles (119.4 km) from Cardiff and 196 miles (315.4 km) from London. Neuadd Wilym is represented in the Senedd by Elin Jones (Plaid Cymru) and is part of the Ceredigion constituency in the House of Commons.

See also
 List of localities in Wales by population

References

Villages in Ceredigion